HMS Skylark was a 10-gun  built for the Royal Navy during the 1820s. She was wrecked in 1845.

Construction and description
Skylark, the second ship of her name to serve in the Royal Navy, was ordered on 25 March 1823, laid down in May 1825 at Pembroke Dockyard, Wales, and launched on 6 June 1826. She was completed on 22 February 1827 at Plymouth Dockyard.

The ship's tonnage was 234 67/94 tons burthen. The Cherokee class was armed with two 6-pounder cannon and eight 18-pounder carronades. The ships had a crew of 52 officers and ratings.

Career
The Royal Navy had taken over the Post Office Packet Service and she became a Falmouth packet.

On 25 March 1842, Skylark was driven ashore at Greenock, Renfrewshire. She was refloated and taken into port.

Fate
On 25 April 1845, Skylark was driven ashore and wrecked at St Alban's Head, Dorset. Her crew survived.

Notes

References

 

Cherokee-class brig-sloops
1826 ships
Ships built in Pembroke Dock
Maritime incidents in March 1842
Maritime incidents in April 1845